Francis John Shaughnessy Jr. (June 21, 1911 – June 12, 1982) was a Canadian/American athlete. In ice hockey, he was a member of the American team which won the bronze medal in the 1936 Winter Olympics. He was the son of Frank Shaughnessy, also an athlete and sports official.

Sporting career
He was born in Roanoke, Virginia and raised in Montreal, Quebec. In Montreal, Shaughnessy was an all-star halfback for the McGill Redmen football team and was also a player on the ice hockey team. Shaughnessy held dual American and Canadian citizenship and he joined the American team for the 1936 Olympics.

Shaughnessy was active in the Canadian Olympic Association, serving as chef de mission at five Olympic Winter Games and was vice president of the COA from 1957 through 1975. Shaughnessy later was one of the organizers of the 1976 Summer Olympics in Montreal. Shaughnessy was also an administrator in the Canadian Ski Association and the Canadian and Quebec Golf Associations. Shaughnessy died in 1982 in Montreal.

References

External links
 
 

1911 births
1982 deaths
American men's ice hockey defensemen
Anglophone Quebec people
Canadian ice hockey defencemen
Ice hockey people from Virginia
Ice hockey players at the 1936 Winter Olympics
McGill Redbirds football players
McGill Redmen ice hockey players
Medalists at the 1936 Winter Olympics
Olympic bronze medalists for the United States in ice hockey
Players of Canadian football from Quebec
Sportspeople from Roanoke, Virginia
American emigrants to Canada